Pizzo Tre Signori is a mountain in the Bergamo Alps, with an elevation of .

Etymology
The name stems from the historical division of the area that it marked, between the State of Milan, the Republic of Venice and the Grisons canton of Switzerland.

Geography
The mountain is located between the Valtellina, Val Brembana and Valsassina. It represents the tripoint between the  Italian provinces of Sondrio, Lecco and Bergamo.

SOIUSA classification
According to the SOIUSA (International Standardized Mountain Subdivision of the Alps) the mountain can be classified in the following way:
main part = Eastern Alps
major sector = Southern Limestone Alps
section = Bergamasque Alps and Prealps
subsection = Bergamo Alps
supergroup = Orobie Occidentali
group = Gruppo del Tre Signori
code = II/C-29.I-B.6

References

Mountains of Lombardy
Mountains of the Alps
Two-thousanders of Italy